SKY 1 may refer to:

Sky One in England
Sky 5 in New Zealand, formerly Sky 1